Noah Mahalang’ang’a Wekesa (born 21 August 1936) is a Kenyan politician. He is affilaited to the Party of National Unity and was elected 1988, 2000, 2002 and in the 2007 Kenyan general election to represent the Kwanza Constituency of the National Assembly of Kenya. He lost the seat to Ferdinand Wanyonyi in March 2013. Wekesa was Assistant Minister at Agriculture and Livestock Development from 1988–1992 and May 2004 as Assistant Minister for Livestock and Fisheries. He was the Minister for Science and Technology from December 2005 to 2007 and also acted as Minister for Education in 2007. He was the Minister for Forestry and Wildlife from 2008–2012.

He was educated at Kakamega School and graduated from the University of Edinburgh with a Bachelor's degree in Veterinary Medicine and Surgery.

He was elected to parliament for the first time in 1988. These were the last one-party-system elections in Kenya. He used to be a rally driver and he has featured in Safari Rally. He was a chairman of the Kenya Lawn Tennis Association. His son Paul Wekesa is a retired prominent tennis player.

References

1936 births
Members of the National Assembly (Kenya)
Living people
Kenyan Luhya people
Government ministers of Kenya
Party of National Unity (Kenya) politicians
Alumni of Kakamega School
Alumni of the University of Edinburgh